Euba is a surname. Notable people with the surname include:
 
 Akin Euba (1935–2020), Nigerian composer, musicologist, and pianist
 Femi Euba (born 1942), Nigerian actor and dramatist
 Jon Mikel Euba (born 1967), Basque artist
 Wolf Euba (1934–2013), German reciter, actor, director and radio author
 Rafa Euba (born 1960), Basque author

See also
 Chemnitz-Euba, part of Chemnitz, Germany
 Ekonomická univerzita v Bratislave, see University of Economics in Bratislava
 Pacific island, see Pacific island